The 2016 Mnet Asian Music Awards ceremony, organized by CJ E&M through its music channel Mnet, took place at the AsiaWorld-Expo in Hong Kong. The ceremony was the seventh consecutive Mnet Asian Music Awards to be hosted outside of South Korea and the 18th ceremony in the show's history.

Nominees were announced on October 28, 2016, through the 2016 MAMA Nomination Special Live Broadcast aired on Mnet streamed nationally and globally. Leading the awards was Exo with 3.

Background
MAMA 2016 was the eighteenth edition of the Mnet Asian Music Awards. It was simultaneously broadcast live in South Korea, Japan, the United States and Southeast Asia. In Sri Lanka and Thailand, it was made available to stream on Iflix 24 hours after its broadcast in South Korea. This marked the fifth consecutive time the event would take place in the same country and the fourth consecutive time to be held in the same venue.

However, MAMA 2016 has the lowest TV ratings since 2009 edition.

Performers and presenters
The following individuals and groups, listed in order of appearance, presented awards or performed musical numbers.

Performers

Presenters

 Moon Hee-joon, Shin A-young, Z.Hera – red carpet hosts
 Lee Byung-hun – main host
 Twice – presented Best New Artist (Female)
 Gong Myung, Park Ha-sun – presented Best New Artist (Male)
 Wang Tang Lu – introduced 'Memories of Springtime' performance
 Park Ki-woong, Choo Ja-hyun – presented Best Asian Style
 John H. Lee, Lee Ji-ah – presented Worldwide Favorite Artist
 Kwon Hyuk-soo – presented Best OST
 Lee Soo-hyuk, Kang Seung-hyun – presented Best Female Artist and Best Dance Performance (Male)
 Wang Ta Lu, Park Min-young – presented Worldwide Performer
 Han Ji-min – introduced 'Girls Education' campaign
 Ahn Jae-hyun, Shin Hye-sun – presented Best Vocal Performance (Male & Female)
 Seo Kang-joon, Emma Wu – presented Best Dance Performance (Solo) and Best Vocal Performance (Group)
 Park Seo-joon, Han Hyo-joo – presented Best Male Group and Best Female Group
 Jang Hyuk, Hwang Jung-eum – presented Best Collaboration and Best Rap Performance
 Park Bo-gum, Kim Yoo-jung – presented Best Male Artist and Best Dance Performance (Female)
 Quincy Jones – speech about theme
 Cha Seung-won – presented Song of the Year
 Ha Ji-won – presented Artist of the Year
 Leon Lai – presented Album of the Year

Judging criteria
Eligible nominees included songs and/or albums released from October 31, 2015, until October 27 the next year. Winners would be selected based on six categories including online voting and evaluation from MAMA professional panel.

Winners and nominees
Winners are listed first and highlighted in boldface.

Following the announcement of the nominees on October 28, online voting opened on the official MAMA website via PC and mobile web. The voting ended on December 1, 2016.

Special Awards

 World Performer Award: Seventeen
 iQIYI Worldwide Favourite Artist: Got7
 Best of Next Male Artist Award: Monsta X
 Best of Next Female Artist Award: Blackpink
 Best Producer: Black Eyed Pilseung
 Best Visual & Art Director: Min Hee-jin
 Best Choreographer: J.Da Apissara Phetruengrong
 Best Promoter: Masahiro Hikada
 Best Executive Producer: Bang Si Hyuk
 Best International Producer: Timbaland
 Best Engineer: Tanaka Hironobu
 Inspired Achievement: Quincy Jones
 Best Asian Style: Exo
 Best Asian Artist: Getsunova; Noo Phuoc Thinh; Isyana Sarasvati; JJ Lin; Sekai no Owari; Hua Chenyu

Multiple nominations
The following artist(s) received two or more nominations (excluding the special awards):

Network

Notes

References

External links
 Mnet Asian Music Awards  official website

Mnet
Mnet
MAMA Awards ceremonies
2016 in Hong Kong